{{DISPLAYTITLE:C25H36O2}}
The molecular formula C25H36O2 may refer to:

 AMG-41, an analgesic drug
 Pentarane A, a steroidal progestin
 Variecolin, a bio-active ascomycete isolate.

Molecular formulas